The Canadian Bank of Commerce was a Canadian bank which was founded in 1867, and had hundreds of branches throughout Canada. It merged in 1961 with the Imperial Bank of Canada to form the Canadian Imperial Bank of Commerce.

History
In 1866 a group of businessmen, including William McMaster, purchased a charter from the defunct Bank of Canada, which had folded in 1858. 
The Canadian Bank of Commerce was founded the following year, issued stock, and opened its headquarters in Toronto, Ontario.

The bank soon opened branches in London, St. Catharines and Barrie. During the following years, the bank opened more branches in Ontario, and took over the business of the local Gore Bank, before expanding across Canada through the acquisition of the Bank of British Columbia in 1901 and the Halifax Banking Company in 1903.

By 1907 the Canadian Bank of Commerce had 172 branches. By the beginning of World War II, this had expanded to 379 branches, including a large building by Darling and Pearson in Winnipeg, Manitoba, built in 1910 in beaux-arts classic style.

During World War I, 1,701 staff from the Canadian Bank of Commerce enlisted in the war effort. A memorial on the East and West Memorial Buildings in Ottawa, Ontario is dedicated to the memory of 1701 Men of the Canadian Bank of Commerce who served in the First World War A War Memorial at Commerce Court in Toronto, Ontario commemorates their service.

In 1931, the Toronto headquarters of the bank, designed by architects John Pearson and Frank Darling, was completed.  At 34 stories, for many years it was the tallest building in the British Empire.

Once again, during World War II, 2,300 staff members enlisted in the armed forces.

The Canadian Bank of Commerce merged with the Imperial Bank of Canada in 1961 to form the Canadian Imperial Bank of Commerce (CIBC), now one of the Big Five Canadian banks.

Architecture
The following are on the Registry of Historical Places of Canada.

 the Bank of Commerce in Nanaimo, British Columbia, built in 1914.
 the Canadian Bank of Commerce in New Westminster, British Columbia built in 1910 to 1911.
 the Bank of Commerce in Vancouver, British Columbia, built in 1914 to 1915
 the Canadian Bank of Commerce in Watson, Saskatchewan built in 1906 to 1907.
 the Bank of Commerce in Nokomis, Saskatchewan, built in 1910.
 the Bank of Commerce in Winnipeg, Manitoba, completed in 1912.
 the Bank of Commerce in Kelsey (Carrot Valley), Manitoba, built in The Pas in 1912.
 the Canadian Bank of Commerce in Innisfree, Alberta, built in 1905.
 the Canadian Bank of Commerce in Dawson, Yukon, built in 1901.

Mergers
The Canadian Bank of Commerce grew through acquisitions of other banks in Canada:

 Halifax Banking Company Established in 1825 and merged with the Commerce in 1903.
 Gore Bank Formed in 1836 and merged with the Commerce in 1870.
 Eastern Townships Bank Formed in 1859 and merged with the Commerce in 1912.
 Bank of British Columbia Established with a Royal Charter in 1862 and merged with the Commerce in 1901.
 Merchants Bank of Prince Edward Island Formed Oct 6, 1871  and merged with the Commerce in 1906.
 Bank of Hamilton Bank of Hamilton merged with the Commerce in 1924.
 The Standard Bank of Canada (changed to St Lawrence Bank 1872-1876) Formed in 1876 and merged with the Commerce in 1928.

See also

List of Canadian banks
Barcelona Traction was known locally as "the Canadian one" since  the bank was its main shareholder.

References

 Charles Peers Davidson `A Compilation Of The Statutes Passed Since Confederation Relating To Banks And Banking, Government And Other Savings Banks, Promissory Notes And Bills` BiblioLife | January 10, 2010

Defunct banks of Canada
Canadian Imperial Bank of Commerce
Banks disestablished in 1961
Banks established in 1867
1867 establishments in Ontario
1961 disestablishments in Ontario
1961 mergers and acquisitions
Canadian companies established in 1867